The 2010 Sultan Qaboos Cup was the 38th edition of the Sultan Qaboos Cup, the premier knockout tournament for football teams in Oman. This edition of the cup was nicknamed "Al-Kass Al-'Arba'een", literally meaning "The 40th Cup", due to the country's 40th anniversary of modernity (although the cup was in fact only in its 38th edition).

The competition began on 17 September 2010 with the qualification round and concluded on 12 December 2010. Saham SC were the defending champions, having won their first title in 2009. On Sunday 12 December 2010, Al-Oruba SC were crowned the champions of the 2011 Sultan Qaboos Cup when they defeated Fanja SC 5–3 on penalties after the match had ended 1-1 after extra time, hence winning the title for the third time.

Teams
This year the tournament had 37 teams. The winners qualified for the 2011 AFC Cup.
 Ahli Sidab Club (Sidab)
 Al-Bashaer Club 
 Al-Ittihad Club (Salalah)
 Al-Kamel Wa Al-Wafi SC 
 Al-Khaboora SC (Al-Khaboura)
 Al-Musannah SC (Al-Musannah)
 Al-Mudhaibi SC (Mudhaibi)
 Al-Nahda Club (Al-Buraimi)
 Al-Nasr S.C.S.C. (Salalah)
 Al-Oruba SC (Sur)
 Al-Rustaq SC (Rustaq)
 Al-Salam SC (Sohar)
 Al-Seeb Club (Seeb)
 Al-Shabab Club (Seeb)
 Al-Suwaiq Club (Suwaiq
 Al-Tali'aa SC (Sur)
 Al-Wahda SC (Sur)
 Bahla Club (Bahla)
 Bidia SC (Bidiya)
 Bowsher Club (Bawshar)
 Dhofar S.C.S.C. (Salalah)
 Fanja SC (Fanja)
 Ibri Club (Ibri)
 Ja'lan SC (Jalan Bani Bu Ali)
 Madha SC  (Madha)
 Majees SC (Majees)
 Mirbat SC (Mirbat)
 Muscat Club (Muscat)
 Nizwa Club (Nizwa)
 Oman Club (Muscat)
 Quriyat Club (Quriyat)
 Saham SC (Saham)
 Salalah SC (Salalah)
 Sohar SC (Sohar)
 Sur SC (Sur)
 Yanqul SC (Yanqul)

Qualification round

Round 1
1 tie was played over one leg. Bowsher Club advanced to the Round 2 of qualification after defeating Ibri Club.

Round 2
8 teams played a knockout tie. 4 ties were played over one leg. The first match was played between Al-Rustaq SC and Boshwer Club on 20 September 2010. Al-Rustaq SC, Yanqul SC, Nizwa Club and Al-Kamel Wa Al-Wafi SC advanced to the Round of 32 after winning their respective ties.

Round of 32
32 teams played a knockout tie. 16 ties were played over one leg. The draw for the round of 32 was held on 26 September 2010. The first match played was between Al-Bashaer Club and Nizwa Club on 3 October 2010. 16 teams advanced to the Round of 16.

Round of 16
16 teams played a knockout tie. 8 ties were played over one leg. The first match was played between Ahli Sidab Club and Yanqul SC on 14 October 2010. 8 teams advanced to the Quarterfinals.

Quarterfinals
8 teams played a knockout tie. 4 ties were played over two legs. The first match was played between Al-Tali'aa SC and Dhofar S.C.S.C. on 22 October 2010. Dhofar S.C.S.C., Ahli Sidab Club, Fanja SC and Al-Oruba SC qualified for the Semifinals.

1st Legs

2nd Legs

Semifinals
4 teams played a knockout tie. 2 ties were played over two legs. The first match was played between Ahli Sidab Club and Fanja SC on 5 November 2010. Fanja SC and Al-Oruba SC qualified for the finals.

1st Legs

2nd Legs

Finals

External links
Oman Sultan Cup 2010-2011 at Soccerway.com
2010-2011 at Goalzz.com
Oman Sultan Cup 2010-2011 Finals-Fanja 1-1 Al-Oruba (Penalty Shootout)

Sultan Qaboos Cup seasons
Cup